Rupandehi 3 is one of three parliamentary constituencies of the Rupandehi District in Nepal. This constituency came into existence from the Constituency Delimitation Commission(CDC) report submitted on 31 August 2017.

Incorporated areas 
Rupandehi 3 incorporates Sudhdhodhan Rural Municipality, Sidhhartanagar Municipality, wards 1 to 3, 6 and 7 of Sivari Rural Municipality, ward 2 of Omasatiya Rural Municipality, wards 7 and 8 of Mayadevi Rural Municipality, wards 13 and 14 of Tilottama Municipality and wards 14 to 19 of Butwal Sub-metropolitan City.

Assembly segments 
It encompasses the following Lumbini Provincial Assembly segments.

 Rupandehi 3(A)
 Rupandehi 3(B)

Members of Parliament

Parliament/Constituent Assembly

Provincial Assembly

3(A)

3(B)

Election results

Election in the 2020s

2022 general election

Election in the 2010s

2017 legislative elections

2017 Nepalese provincial elections

3(A)

3(B)

2013 Constituent Assembly election

Election in the 2000s

2008 Constituent Assembly election

Election in the 1990s

1999 legislative elections

1994 legislative elections

1991 legislative elections

See also 

 List of parliamentary constituencies of Nepal

References

External links 

 Constituency map of Rupandehi

Parliamentary constituencies of Nepal